The Armenian Bible is due to Saint Mesrob's early-5th-century translation. The first monument of Armenian literature is the version of the Holy Scriptures. Isaac, says Moses of Chorene, made a translation of the Bible from the Syriac text about 411. This work must have been considered imperfect, for soon afterwards John of Egheghiatz and Joseph of Baghin were sent to Edessa to translate the Scriptures. They journeyed as far as Constantinople, and brought back with them authentic copies of the Greek text. With the help of other copies obtained from Alexandria the Bible was translated again from the Greek according to the text of the Septuagint and Origen's Hexapla. This version, now in use in the Armenian Church, was completed around the year 434.

The first sentence in Armenian written down by St. Mesrop after he invented the letters is said to be the opening line of Solomon's Book of Proverbs:

See also 
 Biblical canon#Canons of various Christian traditions
 
 List of Bible translations by language

References

Further reading

External links
 Online Eastern Armenian Bible
 The Bible Society of Armenia
 http://armenianbible.org/

Armenian culture
Armenian literature
Armenia
History of religion in Armenia